The Fluebrig (2,098 m) is a mountain massif of the Schwyzer Alps, located east of Unteriberg in the canton of Schwyz. It is composed of several summits of which the highest is named Diethelm and the second highest Turner (2,069 m).

On its northern side, the Fluebrig overlooks the Lake of Sihl (west) and the Lake of Wägital (east).

References

External links

 Fluebrig on Hikr

Mountains of Switzerland
Mountains of the Alps
Mountains of the canton of Schwyz